Trần Phú (1904 – 1931) was a Vietnamese revolutionary and the first general secretary of the Indochinese Communist Party. Several places in Vietnam are named after him:

Trần Phú, Hoàng Mai, a ward of Hoàng Mai District, Hanoi.
Trần Phú, Bắc Giang, a ward of Bắc Giang
Trần Phú, Bình Định, a ward of Quy Nhơn
Trần Phú, Hà Giang, a ward of Hà Giang
Trần Phú, Hà Tĩnh, a ward of Hà Tĩnh
Trần Phú, Hải Dương, a ward of Hải Dương
Trần Phú, Quảng Ngãi, a ward of Quảng Ngãi
Trần Phú, Quảng Ninh, a ward of Móng Cái
Trần Phú, Chương Mỹ, a rural commune of Chương Mỹ District, Hanoi
Trần Phú, Bắc Kạn, a rural commune of Na Rì District
Nông trường Trần Phú, a town of Văn Chấn District, Yên Bái Province

Tran Phu (Phủ rather than Phú) was also the birth name of an emperor of the Trần Dynasty of Dai Viet

Trần Nghệ Tông (1321 – 1394)